Joe Bleymaier (born August 9, 1982) is an American football coach who is the wide receivers coach for the Kansas City Chiefs of the National Football League (NFL). He was previously a quality control coach, pass game analyst, and assistant quarterbacks coach for the Chiefs, and was also a quality control coach at the University of Colorado Boulder.

Coaching career 
Bleymaier joined the Kansas City Chiefs coaching staff in 2016 as a quality control coach, at the recommendation of former college teammate and Chiefs general manager Brett Veach, as well as former Delaware quarterback and then-Chiefs offensive coordinator Matt Nagy. He was promoted to pass game analyst and assistant quarterbacks coach in 2018, winning his first career Super Bowl the following season when the Chiefs defeated the San Francisco 49ers in Super Bowl LIV 31–20.

As one of the Chiefs coaches whose duties include advance scouting of opposing teams, Bleymaier was one of the assistant coaches for the Chiefs given credit for helping them convert a 4th-and-1 play in the 2020 AFC Divisional Round that helped them advance into the next round of the playoffs. He was also credited by Chiefs head coach Andy Reid for his behind-the-scenes work on the Chiefs' innovative and creative concepts on offense.

Bleymaier was promoted to wide receivers coach on April 2, 2021.

In 2022, Bleymaier won his second Super Bowl when the Chiefs defeated the Philadelphia Eagles 38-35 in Super Bowl LVII.

Personal life 
Bleymaier is the son of former Boise State and San Jose State athletic director Gene Bleymaier. After earning his Juris Doctor degree, he went to work for the University of the Pacific's athletic department as an assistant director of compliance before opening a tech start-up with his brother.

References

External links 
 Kansas City Chiefs profile
 Colorado profile

1982 births
Living people
Sportspeople from Boise, Idaho
Players of American football from Idaho
Coaches of American football from Idaho
American football wide receivers
Arizona State Sun Devils football players
Delaware Fightin' Blue Hens football players
High school football coaches in Wisconsin
Colorado Buffaloes football coaches
Kansas City Chiefs coaches